Goniotropis kuntzeni is a species of ground beetle in the family Carabidae. It is found in Central America and North America. Adults can be found on trees at night. Larvae dig burrows that they close off with their terminal disk, capturing prey with their terminal disk and dragging prey into the burrow.

Subspecies
These two subspecies belong to the species Goniotropis kuntzeni:
 Goniotropis kuntzeni kuntzeni Bänninger, 1927
 Goniotropis kuntzeni maracayensis Deuve, 2001

References

Further reading

 

Paussinae
Articles created by Qbugbot
Beetles described in 1927
Beetles of North America